Mitch Kern (born 1965 New York City) is a photographer and educator who has been working in the field for over 25 years https://auarts.ca/about-auarts/faculty-and-staff/mitch-kern. He is an associate professor of photography at Alberta University of the Arts and has exhibited his work in various galleries and publications.
 
His work explores the themes of identity, perception, emotion and communication through portraits of people and animals. He uses digital, analog and video means to create images that challenge the viewers to question their own assumptions and biases https://www.gallerieswest.ca/events/mitch-kern-conundrums/.
 
One example of his work is Conundrums, a series of photographs that depict people wearing animal masks in urban settings. The masks create a contrast between the human body and the animal face, suggesting a sense of alienation, confusion or curiosity. The masks also hide the facial expressions of the subjects, making it difficult to read their emotions or intentions.
 
Another example is Vicarious Nature, a series of photographs that show animals interacting with human-made objects or environments. The animals are either curious, playful or fearful of these unfamiliar elements, revealing their personalities and emotions. The photographs also raise questions about the relationship between humans and nature, and how we affect each other’s lives.

Early Life 
He was born in New York City in 1965. In 1977 he moved to Los Angeles where he attended the American Academy of Dramatic Arts https://www.aada.edu/.

He played Stooky in Michael Rhodes’ Soup Man https://www.youtube.com/watch?v=KDvoqPivlw4, https://www.imdb.com/title/tt10482586/ and Marc Goldsmith in Lawrence Bassoff’s Today I am a Man… I think https://www2.bfi.org.uk/films-tv-people/4ce2b779ed8f3.

Mid Life 
He went to Birmingham High School https://en.wikipedia.org/wiki/Birmingham_High_School, has a bachelor of arts (BA) degree from the University of Maryland Baltimore County (UMBC) https://umbc.edu/ and a masters of fine arts (MFA) degree from Penn State University https://www.psu.edu/. 

He worked as a staff photographer at Times Mirror Company and Tribune Media and was a stringer for the Associated Press https://apnews.com/, United Press international https://www.upi.com/ and the Washington Times https://www.washingtontimes.com/. He was a photo editor at Insight Magazine https://en.wikipedia.org/wiki/Insight_on_the_News. 

He worked as an assistant professor at the University of Central Missouri (UCM) https://www.ucmo.edu/ and Louisiana Tech University (LTU) https://www.latech.edu/. He is currently an associate professor at Alberta University of the Arts (AUArts) https://www.auarts.ca/, https://www.auarts.ca/about-auarts/faculty-and-staff/mitch-kern.

Current Work 
Kern maintains a full-time teaching career and part-time photography practice. His work is represented by Herringer Kiss Gallery https://www.herringerkissgallery.com. He runs a boutique portrait studio Headshot Studio YYC https://headshotstudioyyc.com.

References 

 http://www.mitchkern.com
 https://www.youtube.com/watch?v=oa4-rt_otSA
 http://www.artnet.com/artists/mitch-kern/
 https://web.archive.org/web/20070509071901/http://www.ocm.auburn.edu/clippings/100604.pdf
 http://www.artnet.de/event/72519/mitch-kern--donald-lipski.html
 https://web.archive.org/web/20110706164011/http://www.goodmedicine.acadnet.ca/project/?page_id=4
 http://www.banffcentre.ca/bnmi/news/archive/2008/good_medicine.asp
 https://web.archive.org/web/20080626092106/http://www.trianglegallery.com/exhibits/2008contemporaryphoto/index.html
 https://web.archive.org/web/20090206114845/http://www.exposurecalgarybanff.com/
 http://simresidency.blogspot.com/2008/09/year-month-name-country-of-origion-2005.html
 https://web.archive.org/web/20100707235247/http://www.arcgallery.org/exhibition_archives.aspx?Year=2005&month=2
 https://web.archive.org/web/20110525130714/http://www.ffwdweekly.com/Issues/2006/1207/film1.htm
 http://chronicle.com/free/v48/i38/38a03101.htm
 http://ca.groups.yahoo.com/group/AboriginalArtsAdministrators/message/717
 http://ethicalinvestment.eu/list_of_photographers_en.html
 http://www.answers.com/topic/list-of-photographers
 https://web.archive.org/web/20110728042200/http://www.southernlightgallery.org/index.php?option=com_content&task=view&id=61&Itemid=45
 http://www.brainpress.com/PDF/extn_calendar_ss_08.pdf
 http://www.informationdelight.info/information/entry/Portrait_photography

American contemporary artists
1965 births
Living people